Leaving It All Behind is the fifth studio album by the American rock band The Grass Roots, released in November 1969 by Dunhill Records. Following the departure of Creed Bratton, who left in April 1969, seasoned musician Dennis Provisor joined the group solidifying the new direction of the band. Terry Furlong and Brian Naughton became alternating touring guitarists for the group. In a return to grace for the group member composers, it contained six songs written by the group. The album was intended to move the group further in a soulful direction that was being rewarded by more charting singles. The A and B side singles released were "I'd Wait a Million Years", "Heaven Knows" b/w "Don't Remind Me", and "Walking Through The Country" b/w "Truck Drivin' Man". At the end of this run "Something's Comin' Over Me" was released as a B side to "Come On And Say It", a charting single written by the group that appeared on the band's next compilation album, More Golden Grass. The album charted at #36, making it the group's highest-charting studio album.

Songs

The songs featured unique horn punctuated touches by arranger Sid Feller. However, Jimmie Haskell provided the arrangements for the songs "Wait a Million Years" and "Heaven Knows." The group contributed heavily to this album, as for the first time since Feelings, the majority of songs were written or co-written by group members. Drummer Rick Coonce sang lead vocals on a self-penned song, "Truck Drivin' Man." The remainder of the songs were written by new outside composers and the competing songwriting duos of Price & Walsh and Lambert & Potter. Dunhill Records executives liked the established soulful direction and the group was rewarded with success in the charts and given more creative input for seeing it through.

Artwork, packaging
The original release of Leaving It All Behind is on Dunhill ABC in stereo. The record came in a gatefold sleeve featuring photos of the band in concert, as well as a photo of the group posing with a pickup truck (the latter of which would later be used on the cover of 1971's gold-selling compilation Their 16 Greatest Hits). The front cover was designed by Gundelfinger/Schnepf, with photos taken by Tom Gundelfinger.

Original LP releases list the song "Hold on to What You Got" on the rear of the LP jacket, however the song is not featured on the actual LP and to this day remains unreleased, although the CD release from 2004 even has a leaflet containing among others the lyrics of this lost song, crediting it to Warren Entner. It may be considered a lost recording due to parent company MCA "purging" all unnecessary media in the late 1970s.

Track listing
All songs produced by Steve Barri.

Personnel
The Grass Roots
Rob Grill – vocals, bass
Warren Entner – guitar, vocals
Rick Coonce – drums, percussion, vocals
Dennis Provisor - keyboard instruments, vocals

Additional personnel
Steve Barri – producer
Phil Kaye – engineer
Sid Feller – arrangements
Jimmie Haskell – arrangements
Session musicians – various instruments

References 

1969 albums
The Grass Roots albums
Albums arranged by Jimmie Haskell
Albums arranged by Sid Feller
Albums produced by Steve Barri
Dunhill Records albums